Regulatory factor X-associated protein is a protein that in humans is encoded by the RFXAP gene.

Major histocompatibility (MHC) class II molecules are transmembrane proteins that have a central role in development and control of the immune system. The protein encoded by this gene, along with regulatory factor X-associated ankyrin-containing protein and regulatory factor-5, forms a complex that binds to the X box motif of certain MHC class II gene promoters and activates their transcription. Once bound to the promoter, this complex associates with the non-DNA-binding factor MHC class II transactivator, which controls the cell type specificity and inducibility of MHC class II gene expression. Mutations in this gene have been linked to bare lymphocyte syndrome type II, complementation group D. Transcript variants utilizing different polyA signals have been found for this gene.

Interactions
RFXAP has been shown to interact with RFXANK.

References

Further reading